Nadine may refer to:

People
 Nadine (given name)
 Nadine, Countess of Shrewsbury (1913–2003), English opera soprano

Film and TV
 Nadine (1987 film), a 1987 film with Jeff Bridges and Kim Basinger
 , a 2007 Dutch film with Monic Hendrickx

Music

Musicians
Nádine, South African singer
Nadine Coyle, Irish singer from pop group Girls Aloud

Songs
 "Nadine" (song), a 1964 song by Chuck Berry
 "Hello, Nadine", a 1976 song by British band Mungo Jerry
 "Nadine", a 1994 single by punk band Alice Donut 
 "Nadine", a 2003 song by Frank Black and the Catholics from Show Me Your Tears
 "Nadine", a 2009 song by Fool's Gold from Fool's Gold

Albums
 Nadine (album), a 1986 album by George Thorogood
 Nadine (EP), a 2020 EP by Nadine Coyle
 Nádine, a 1997 album by South African singer Nádine

Other
 Nadine (magazine), a Lebanese magazine
 Nadine, New Mexico, U.S.
 Hurricane Nadine, 2012